Malcolm Arnold "Mal" Duncan, currently known as Vox (also known as the Guardian, Hornblower, and the Herald), is a superhero appearing in media published by DC Comics. Introduced in April 1970, he is DC's first African-American superhero.

Publication history
Mal Duncan made his first appearance in Teen Titans #26, and was created by Robert Kanigher and Nick Cardy.

In that issue, the African-American Mal kissed the Caucasian Lilith Clay goodbye, in a scene considered to be the first interracial kiss in comic book history. When editorial director Carmine Infantino objected to the scene, thinking it too controversial, editor Dick Giordano kept the scene, but colored it in blue as a night scene, to draw less attention to the moment. Giordano recalls receiving many letters about the kiss, both hate mail (including one death threat) and many supportive letters approving of the kiss.

Fictional character biography

Pre-Crisis

Malcolm "Mal" Duncan saves the Teen Titans from a street gang called the Hell Hawks by beating their leader in a boxing match. Recruited by the Teen Titans, Mal feels unworthy due to his lack of abilities, and stows away on a rocket flight, which nearly costs him his life. After a time, Mal discovers a strength-enhancing exoskeleton and the costume of the Guardian. Using these, he becomes the second Guardian.

After assuming the Guardian mantle, Mal fights Azrael, the Angel of Death. Believing it to be a hallucination, Mal is surprised to awaken with the mystical Gabriel's Horn. Having defeated Azrael, Mal is permitted to live, provided he never loses another fight. The horn grants Mal unspecified powers, whenever the odds are against him in battle. Armed with the horn, Mal assumes the name Hornblower.

Mal soon returns to his Guardian identity, claiming that too many people knew who he was.

Post-Crisis
Following the Crisis on Infinite Earths, Mal's uncostumed adventures are unchanged. However, in post-Crisis canon, he never took the identity of Guardian, and the Gabriel's Horn is given a very different origin. While the other Titans are on a mission, Mal inadvertently releases an old villain, the Gargoyle (formerly Mister Twister), from Limbo. He recaptures the villain, but finds the plans for a high-tech horn that would create spatial warps. With the help of Karen Beecher, he builds the horn and takes the identity of Herald. However, the Gargoyle implanted a computer virus into the horn that weakens the boundaries between the mortal world and Limbo, so he and his master, the Antithesis, will eventually escape. When Mal discovers this, he destroys the horn. He and Karen retire from super heroics, and move to California.

While it seemed first that the introduction of the Herald identity retconned away the Hornblower name, later issues of Dan Jurgens' Teen Titans run confirmed that Mal had used the name Hornblower as well.

During the JLA/Titans event, Mal acquires a new Gabriel's Horn, and later, he and Bumblebee join the short-lived Titans LA. In the Titans Tomorrow storyline, the Mal of the alternate future becomes president of the Eastern United States.

When Doctor Light captures Green Arrow, taking him as a hostage and demanding to see the Titans (a plot to take revenge on the team that had often humiliated him), Mal, Bumblebee, and about two dozen other former Titans are assembled to fight him. He and Bumblebee then join a team of heroes gathered by Troia to embark on an ominous mission into deep space during Infinite Crisis. The group eventually encounters a rift in the universe caused by Alexander Luthor, who is re-creating the multiverse and restructuring it to create the "perfect" universe—a plan that would lead to the deaths of billions of people, and the entire post-crisis DC Universe. The team of heroes in space is able to temporarily stop Luthor, but in the resulting chaos they are scattered; some are killed, while others go missing for varying lengths of time, including Mal and Karen.

52

Four weeks after disappearing in space, Mal is rescued from a Zeta Beam transport accident. His lungs and vocal cords were damaged after the Gabriel's Horn blew up in his face. Mal's body rejected the cybernetic grafting of parts from the Red Tornado until Steel used his Pseudocyte technology to permanently graft the parts into Mal's body.

One Year Later

One whole year after the events in Infinite Crisis, Mal has joined the Doom Patrol alongside his wife Bumblebee. Now going by the codename Vox, Mal speaks with a synthesized voice box which can create unusually strong hypersonic blasts and open dimensional portals, wormholes, and vortexes similar to the Gabriel Horn. Later, in an issue of the newest Doom Patrol series, Mal and Karen are now divorced.

Following the disbanding of the Doom Patrol, Bumblebee appears as one of the former Titans who arrives at Titans Tower to repel Superboy-Prime and the Legion of Doom.

The New 52
In The New 52, a reboot DC's continuity, Mal is introduced as an award-winning film composer and the husband of Karen, who is pregnant with their daughter. He is later kidnapped by Mister Twister, who reveals that as a teenager, Mal was a member of the original Teen Titans under the name Herald. The Titans had allowed their memories of each other to be erased to defeat Twister, but he now seeks to use Mal's sonic abilities to complete a ritual that will allow a powerful demonic entity to enter the human world. When Karen (who has now gained superpowers of her own) and the former Titans arrive, they are able to defeat Mister Twister once and for all.

DC Rebirth
Following this incident during DC Rebirth, Mal reveals to Karen that he underwent a procedure to remove his superpowers so that the couple could live a normal life. When Karen suits up as Bumblebee to help the Titans battle the Fearsome Five, Mal steals a suit of blue and gold tactical body armor (resembling his Pre-Crisis Guardian costume) from Nightwing's room in Titans Tower to back her up. However, by the time he reaches the battle, he finds that Psimon has psychically removed all of Bumblebee's memories of Mal and the baby. Spurning Mal's attempts to reconnect, the amnesiac Bumblebee chooses to stay with the Titans.

Enraged by this turn of events, Mal returns to his vigilante roots and partners with his former teammate Gnarrk to hunt down H.I.V.E., believing they hold the key to restoring Karen's memory. During one of these raids, Mal and Gnarrk are brainwashed and turned into avatars of the mysterious entity Mister Twister serves. The entity is ultimately revealed to be Troia, an evil version of Donna Troy from a possible future. Troia forces Mal and Gnarrk to battle the Titans, but the two heroes are freed from her control when Donna manages to vanquish her future counterpart. With Karen's memories restored, Mal helps the Titans take down Mister Twister and the Key. After the Titans are forcibly disbanded by the Justice League, Karen finally returns home to Mal and the baby.

Powers and abilities
Formerly, his Gabriel Horn could open up multi-dimensional portals and generate strong hypersonic blasts. He now relies more on his artificial lungs and voice box to achieve the same effects. He also has a background in kickboxing, and hand-to-hand combat, and is in exceptional physical condition.

In the New 52 continuity, Mal possesses sonic and harmonic abilities that he projects by using his voice.

In other media

Television
 Mal Duncan as the Herald appears in Teen Titans, voiced by Khary Payton. This version wears a mask and is an honorary member of the Teen Titans.
 Mal Duncan appears in Young Justice, voiced by Kevin Michael Richardson. Introduced in the episode "Targets", this version is initially a high school student. As of season two, Duncan has joined the Team as their mission coordinator. In the episode "Cornered", Duncan assumes the Guardian suit and equipment after most of the Team and Justice League are incapacitated by Despero and fights the alien to buy time for Superboy, Miss Martian, and Zatanna to disable Despero. Duncan continues to operate as Guardian for the rest of the season before retiring off-screen as of Young Justice: Outsiders to focus on his relationship with Karen Beecher and their daughter Rhea.

Miscellaneous
 Mal Duncan as the Herald appears in Teen Titans Go!.
 Mal Duncan as the Guardian makes non-speaking appearances in DC Super Hero Girls as a student of Super Hero High.

Notes

References

External links
 World of Black Heroes: Vox biography

DC Comics male superheroes
DC Comics martial artists
DC Comics characters who can teleport 
African-American superheroes
Fictional characters with dimensional travel abilities
Fictional characters who can manipulate sound
Fictional African-American people
Fictional musicians
Comics characters introduced in 1970
Characters created by Robert Kanigher
DC Comics metahumans